Sand Ridge Golf Club, was designed by Tom Fazio and is located in Munson Township, Geauga County, Ohio, near Chardon. Construction on the course started in late 1995 and opened for its private members on May 18, 1998. It also contains the headwaters of both the Chagrin and Cuyahoga rivers.

Sand Ridge is recognized as a top-caliber golf course and ranked as high as 52nd best course in the U.S for 2005-2006 by Golf Digest. Sand Ridge was the first course in Ohio, and one of a select few in the world, to be designated as a Certified Audubon International Signature Wildlife Sanctuary.

Sand Ridge merged with The Mayfield Country Club in 2006, and is now half of The Mayfield Sand Ridge Club. Having two courses available to the members has made the combination especially desirable in the Eastern Cleveland Private Club market. in 2018, the club was purchased by local business executive, Monte Ahuja, who also owns Barrington Golf Club

Events 

The course has hosted numerous events including:

1999 U.S. Open Regional Qualifier
2000 USGA Senior Amateur Qualifier
2001 U.S. Women's Mid-Amateur Qualifier
2006 NCAA Regional qualifier
Won by eventual national champion Oklahoma State
2022 Korn Ferry Tour Qualifying School

Course Information 

 110 bunkers
 7 water hazards
 18 holes
 55 tees driving range
 Greens Grass: Bent Grass   
 Fairways Grass: Bent Grass 
 Par 72 (36-36)
 Rules of USGA Govern all play

Notes:

DD denotes Double Diamond (Championship Tees)
D denotes Diamond Tees (Men's Tees)
S denotes Square Tees (Senior Tees)
C denotes Circles Tees (Women's Tees)
The slope rating of a golf course, typically in the US, is a measure of its difficulty for bogey golfers.
The course rating is the sum of the total pars of the played holes.

Course 

Hole #1: Overture

Par 4, Handicap 15
Championship Tee: 383
Members Tee: 363
Seniors Tee: 290
Ladies Tee: 252
The opening hole is a short par 4 with a right dog leg. The most important shot on this hole is the first.

Hole #2: Plateau

Par 4, Handicap 7
Championship Tee: 421
Members Tee: 383
Seniors Tee: 351
Ladies Tee: 310
A patch of wetlands to the right of the tee is a harbinger. This hole has a generous landing zone for the drive, but the second shot is challenged by a two-tiered elevated green.

Hole #3: Craters

Par 5, Handicap 1
Championship Tee: 575
Members Tee: 545
Seniors Tee: 511
Ladies Tee: 402
The course's #1 handicap hole is a long, uphill par 5, protected by 24 bunkers. Only two small bunkers are visible from the tee-box, all are visible from the second and third shot, and NONE are seen from the green when looking back at the tee-box.

Hole #4: Vista

Par 3, Handicap 13
Championship Tee: 223
Members Tee: 186
Seniors Tee: 157
Ladies Tee: 121
Requires a carry over tall fescue and bunkers onto a narrow green. This one plays long.

Hole #5: Twin

Par 4, Handicap 3
Championship Tee: 438
Members Tee: 407
Seniors Tee: 376
Ladies Tee: 333
With two separate greens, this hole features a fascinating strategy contrast. When the pin is on the left green, a monster bunker protects the hole and the player will need to fight through dense rough. The right green is open, but has a long right dog leg.

Hole #6: Ledge

Par 5, Handicap 11
Championship Tee: 527
Members Tee: 485
Seniors Tee: 450
Ladies Tee: 407
This is a medium Par 5, requiring a drive between flanking bunkers. The player has to account for a prevailing headwind on the difficult third shot to a plateau green.

Hole #7: Draw

Par 4, Handicap 5
Championship Tee: 444
Members Tee: 419
Seniors Tee: 386
Ladies Tee: 339
A downhill Par 4 that will reward a sweeping draw from the tee.

Hole #8: Orphan

Par 3, Handicap 17
Championship Tee: 168
Members Tee: 142
Seniors Tee: 122
Ladies Tee: 103
The hole of this picturesque par 3 is protected by a front-facing pond and wetlands behind. A steep face bunker is located in front of the green.

Hole #9: Snake

Par 4, Handicap 9
Championship Tee: 406
Members Tee: 374
Seniors Tee: 343
Ladies Tee: 300
This hole has a generous landing zone for a tee shot. The green is defended by a pond to the left and multiple traps to the right, making for a daunting second shot.

Hole #10: Pulpit

Par 4, Handicap 10
Championship Tee: 401
Members Tee: 370
Seniors Tee: 340 
Ladies Tee: 294
Blind, uphill tee shot. The second shot requires a long carry over water to a narrow green.

Hole #11: Redan

Par 4, Handicap 4
Championship Tee: 483
Members Tee: 433
Seniors Tee: 376
Ladies Tee: 301
A fade is favored from the tee. However, too much is punished by trees.

Hole #12: Rockside

Par 3, Handicap 18
Championship Tee: 177
Members Tee: 150
Seniors Tee: 121
Ladies Tee: 110
The green is heavily tiered. Involves high punishment for errant tee shots and high reward for accuracy.

Hole #13: Falls

Par 4, Handicap 2
Championship Tee: 466
Members Tee: 444
Seniors Tee: 424
Ladies Tee: 325
One of many visually impressive holes on the course. A waterfall adjacent to the tee sets the stage for the long par 4. Length and accuracy are required from the tee and into the well-protected green. Par is an excellent score.

Hole #14: Dilemma

Par 5, Handicap 8
Championship Tee: 540
Members Tee: 511
Seniors Tee: 480
Ladies Tee: 441
The dilemma is to attempt to carry the wasteland on the second shot or lay-up to the right on this par 5. This is a high risk, high reward Fazio classic with eagle possibilities.

Hole #15: Quarry

Par 4, Handicap 16
Championship Tee: 341
Members Tee: 311
Seniors Tee: 291
Ladies Tee: 257
A short par 4. It looks innocent, but the green requires an adroit player, as it is the toughest on the course.

Hole #16: Cape

Par 4, Handicap 6
Championship Tee: 404
Members Tee: 385
Seniors Tee: 343
Ladies Tee: 286
A dramatic cape hole. Fraught with hazards; the second shot will require pinpoint accuracy.

Hole #17: Headwaters

Par 3, Handicap 14
Championship Tee: 230
Members Tee: 200
Seniors Tee: 180
Ladies Tee: 80
A beautiful, wetlands-traversing hole that requires a  carry.

Hole #18: Split

Par 5, Handicap 12
Championship Tee: 555
Members Tee: 531
Seniors Tee: 490
Ladies Tee: 445
Majestic finishing hole with cross bunkers that split the fairway. Choose from two fairways for your approach, depending on the pin placement. The wetlands frame a generous green, while hawks that often circle the green and surrounding wetlands add a touch of nature to the experience.

References

External links 
 Course Site
 100 Greatest Courses in America
 Pictures and comments on the course

Buildings and structures in Geauga County, Ohio
Golf clubs and courses in Ohio
Golf clubs and courses designed by Tom Fazio
1998 establishments in Ohio